Emmanuel Lutheran Church is a historic Lutheran church building located at 216 S. Aspen Street in Lincolnton, Lincoln County, North Carolina.  It was built in 1919, and is a rectangular Late Gothic Revival style brick church with a four-stage central tower with a conical steeple.  It features pale beige terra cotta, cast stone, granite, and poured cement detailing; lancet arched door and window openings; and stepped buttresses.

It was listed on the National Register of Historic Places in 1994.

References

Lutheran churches in North Carolina
Churches on the National Register of Historic Places in North Carolina
Gothic Revival church buildings in North Carolina
Churches completed in 1919
Churches in Lincoln County, North Carolina
National Register of Historic Places in Lincoln County, North Carolina